St. Cloud Area School District 742 is a school district headquartered in St. Cloud, Minnesota.

It is also known as District 742 Community Schools.

History

In 2016 the district had about 10,000 students.

From 2001 to 2016, the number of students who were learning English as a second language increased by 3.5 times. In 2016 it had around 2,000 students categorized as such, with many being from Somalia.

Willie Jett served as superintendent until he retired in 2021.

Laurie Putnam became the superintendent in 2021, making her the district's first female superintendent. All of the members of the board of education voted to hire her.

District boundary
In Stearns County the district includes the county's portions of St. Cloud and Clearwater, all of St. Joseph, St. John's University, and Waite Park, most of St. Augusta, and sections of Rockville and Sartell.

In Sherburne County the district includes the county's portion of St. Cloud and the majority portion of Clear Lake.

In Benton County the district includes the majority of that county's part of St. Cloud.

In Wright County the district includes the county's portion of Clearwater.

Schools
 High schools
 Apollo High School
 Technical Senior High School
 McKinley-Adult Learning Center

 PK-8 schools
 Kennedy Community School

 Middle schools
 North Middle School
 South Middle School

 Elementary schools
 Clearview Elementary School
 Discovery Elementary School
 Lincoln Elementary School
 Madison Elementary School
 Oak Hill Elementary School
 Talahi Elementary School
 Westwood Elementary School

Former schools:
 McKinley Elementary School
 Roosevelt Elementary School

References

External links
 St. Cloud Area School District

Education in Benton County, Minnesota
Education in Sherburne County, Minnesota
Education in Stearns County, Minnesota
Education in Wright County, Minnesota
School districts in Minnesota
St. Cloud, Minnesota